Saleisha Lashawn Stowers (born January 20, 1986) is an American actress and model. She was cycle 9’s winner America's Next Top Model. She portrayed the role of Lani Price  on NBC's soap opera Days of Our Lives.

Early life
Stowers was born in Pasadena, California. She was raised in Madera by her grandmother. She then moved to Los Angeles, where she worked as a receptionist before appearing on America's Next Top Model.

Career

Modeling
Stowers was signed with Photogenics Model Management and had also appeared in a commercial for fast-food restaurant Wendy's, with actor Tom Lenk. She had modeled for DOMIJ clothing, and d.e.m.o. She was also an extra in an episode of the TV series Ugly Betty and on two episodes of the Tyra Banks Show, modeling for Rami, Project Runway season four contestant. Stowers appeared in the "Welcome Back" music video, and had an ad for 24 Hour Fitness. She also modeled for Especially Yours wigs, and was featured in a fashion spread for InTouch Weekly. She was recruited for America's Next Top Model, where she where she subsequently won the ninth cycle of the competition, beating Chantal Jones in the final. She was signed with Elite Model Management.

Several blogs and news outlets have speculated that her past relationship with Banks (her participation in Banks' T-Zone camp and her past appearances on Tyra's television shows and her appearance as a model on The Tyra Banks Show and Cycle 6 of America's Next Top Model), may have influenced the selection of the winner. Stowers had also been a national spokesmodel for Especially Yours wigs for more than a year before the show ran, as well as appearing in an episode of the hit US sitcom Ugly Betty.

Stowers had a Metro Style campaign along with fellow Top Model alum, Jaslene Gonzalez, Dani Evans and Whitney Thompson. Stowers was on the cover of Seventeen as part of her prize. She has appeared on the cover of Paper Doll Magazine, had a cover and spread in Florida International Magazine and had spreads in the January 2008 issue of InTouch Weekly, OK! Magazine, the July 2008 issue of Essence Magazine, Jam Style. and had a four-page spread in an issue of Macy's. She has modeled for Gilt Groupe and Macy's catalogue online. She has also modeled for Dereon, Apple Bottoms, Baby Phat, and Love Tease for Macy's. Stowers had a campaign with Garage Clothing for their Spring 2009 line. She has also appeared in Modern Bride for the February/March 2009 issue.

Stowers had walked for Tibi in Mercedes-Benz Fashion Week Fall 2008, Peter Som's Bill Blass Fall 2008 Collection at Saks Fifth Avenue on April 2, 2008, Carson Kressley's Safilo USA Spring/Summer '08 Designer Eyewear Fashion Show at Vision Expo East on April 12, 2008, Jose Duran for NYC fashion week, which also showed on her My Life as CoverGirl commercials, a GenArt Fashion Show for Jennifer Mary, Billabong's 2nd Annual Design for Humanity fashion show in Los Angeles, and Pamella Roland at New York Fashion Week, and she opened for a mock Versace runway show. Stowers walked for Beach Bunny Swimwear and Lana Fuchs in Los Angeles Fashion Week Spring/Summer 2009. She also appeared on the Tyra Banks Show for the episode titled Tina Knowles modeling in a House of Dereon fashion show.

Acting
In 2013, Stowers was cast as the daughter of Angie Hubbard (Debbi Morgan), Cassandra Foster on the Prospect Park's continuation of All My Children, she made her debut on April 30, 2013.

In March 2015, Stowers guest starred on an episode of the ABC Family show, Switched at Birth as Tara. In June 2015, Stowers joined the cast of Days of Our Lives in the role of Lani Price. She made her first appearance on September 25, 2015. In the same year, she guest-starred in an episode of Major Crimes as Heather. In 2016, she recurred on Caged as Shawna Carlson. In 2017, she was cast in the lead role of Krista in a film called "Tomboy", as well as Josie Miller in the series "Beyond Therapy". In 2018, she guest-starred in an episode of The Fosters as Priya.

Filmography

References

External links 
 

1986 births
Living people
African-American female models
African-American models
America's Next Top Model winners
American female models
African-American actresses
American soap opera actresses
People from Pasadena, California
21st-century African-American people
21st-century African-American women
20th-century African-American people
20th-century African-American women